Ray is an EP released by Panic Channel on August 29, 2008.

Track listing
 "message" - 3:28
 "Energy" - 3:29
 "Tsubomi (つぼみ)" - 5:39
 "EMERALD" - 4:38 
 "Kamisori (カミソリ)" (ナイフ) – 4:28
 "Jewel" – 4:45

Bonus DVD (limited edition only)
"together"
"Mujou Mayaku" (無情麻薬)

A DVD was released as well, containing an additional music video for "together" and "Mujou Mayaku" (無情麻薬) .

Personnel
 MEGURU – vocals
 Kana – guitar
 Mayo - guitar
 kiri – bass
 KYO~YA – drums

References

2007 EPs
Panic Channel albums